Piranha is a fictional supervillain appearing in American comic books published by Marvel Comics. The character first appeared in Sub-Mariner #70 (May 1974) and was created by Marv Wolfman and George Tuska.

Fictional character biography
The Piranha was created as a result of the experiments of Dr. Lemuel Dorcas, having been exposed to remaining radiation from Dorcas's previous work. After devouring Dorcas's deceased assistants and evolving from a normal piranha into a humanoid piranha, he ordered other fish into the radiation, creating more Men-Fish. Piranha and his Men-Fish traveled to Hydro-Base in the hopes of researching more of Dorcas' work there. They followed Namor and attacked him. During the fight, Piranha was wounded, and his blood attracted his piranhas, which turned on him and devoured him.

These piranhas who ate the original Piranha evolved into identical versions of the original, eventually numbering in the hundreds. They later captured Namor and the Thing, forcing them to fight to the death. The two combatants instead managed to crush the underwater stadium they fought in and crushed all the Piranhas.

The original Piranha eventually regenerated, and joined the Deep Six alongside Nagala, Orka, Sea Urchin, and Tiger Shark while Attuma had seized the throne of Atlantis. Deep Six defended Attuma's throne from the invading Prince Namor and the Defenders twice, but lost to the Defenders the second time.

After Marvel Zombies 3, the zombie Deadpool's head was teleported to the bottom of the ocean along with the Zombie (Simon Garth). The Zombie Deadpool head infected Piranha and all of the Men-Fish with the zombie plague. When the Men-Fish attacked a cruise ship, the new Midnight Sons arrived and destroyed them. As the Midnight Sons explored the ship, the now zombified Piranha attacked them. Daimon Hellstrom causes the ship to explode, destroying all the Men-Fish. Piranha's fate is not shown.

Powers and abilities
The Piranha was a normal piranha mutated by radiation into a semi-humanoid being with sub-human intelligence. The Piranha had superhuman physicality, teeth that were strong and sharp enough to penetrate Namor's skin, claws that were equally as incisive made deadlier by a sleep-inducing venom they generated and the power to command other fish telepathically. Piranha could increase its intellect by consuming the remains of anyone it came across, effectively adding their knowledge, memories and acumen to its own. The creature also boasts a regenerative healing factor powerful enough to physically restore him even from being devoured by his own Men-Fish, but was not powerful enough to prevent his reanimation. After being zombified by a necrolized Headpool, Piranha was turned into a zombie with a greatly augmented appetite.

On top of the standard ability to spread the zombie plague via physical contact; e.i. biting and scratching as he'd done with his piranha men-fish. Piranha gained a parasitic ability to breed and birth schools of zombie men-fish clones of itself as eggs in healthy human hosts, as well as self-spawn without the need of a mating cycle.

References

External links
 

Characters created by George Tuska
Characters created by Marv Wolfman
Comics characters introduced in 1974
Fictional characters with superhuman durability or invulnerability
Fictional fish
Marvel Comics characters who can move at superhuman speeds
Marvel Comics characters with accelerated healing
Marvel Comics characters with superhuman strength
Marvel Comics supervillains
Marvel Comics telepaths